Felecia is a feminine given name. Notable people with the given name Felecia include:
Felecia Angelle (born 1986), American voice actress
Felecia M. Bell (born 1960), American actress
Felecia Lindsey-Howse, member of the American hip-hop collective Mo Thugs
Felecia M. Nave, American chemical engineer and academic administrator
Felecia Rotellini, chairwoman of the Arizona Democratic Party

See also
Felicia